USS Lexington may refer to the following ships of the United States Navy:
 , a brigantine acquired in 1776 and captured in 1777
 , a sloop-of-war in commission from 1826–1830 and 1831–1855
 , a timberclad gunboat in commission from 1861–1865
 , later USS SP-705, a patrol vessel in commission from 1917–1918
 , a  commissioned in 1927 and sunk in 1942

United States Navy ship names